Eparchy of Osječko polje and Baranja (Serbian Cyrillic: Епархија осјечкопољска и барањска or Епархија осечкопољска и барањска) is an eparchy (diocese) of the Serbian Orthodox Church encompassing easternmost areas of Croatia, with seat in Dalj.

Since the death of bishop Lukijan Vladulov in spring of 2017, the eparchy is administered by bishop Irinej Bulović of Bačka. The eparchy has three vicarages (in Osijek, Vukovar and Baranja), with a total of 39 priests and two deacons.

History

Osječko polje (lit. Osijek field) is an old name created in the first years of the 18th century, the area that included the entire area around the city of Osijek and the region between the lower course of the Drava and Danube river and practically whole flow of the river Vuka.
Because Osijek field lies on the border of Syrmia, Baranja and Slavonia, it was added, sometimes to one and sometimes to the other of three neighboring Eparchies, while sometimes it had its own bishop.
In 1710, the Church Parliament in Monastery Krušedol elected Bishop Sofronije as Bishop for all Serbs under Habsburg authority, and Eparchy of Osječko polje provided care to the newly elected Bishop Nicanor Melentijević.

It remained an independent diocese up to 1733, when it was abolished and its Hungarian part was attached to the Eparchy of Budapest, while its Slavonian part to the Syrmian archdiocese. Patriarch Arsenije IV Jovanović Šakabenta handed Eparchy of Osječko polje in 1746 to his Bishop Jovan Georgijević. The residence of Bishop Jovan was in Osijek, where Eparchy then had two houses.
Archbishops Synod after the election of a new Metropolitan in 1748 joined this Eparchy again to the Eparchy of Slavonia-Pakrac.

From 1758 the Eparchy definitely came into the composition of Syrmian diocese till the year 1991. Holy Assembly of the Serbian Orthodox Church in 1991 renewed Osječko polje eparchy and joined the whole Baranja to it, so the eparchy got its present name: Osječko Polje and Baranja Eparchy.

List of local parochial churches
 Church of the Saint Archangel Michael, Beli Manastir
 Church of the Transfer of the relics of the Holy Father Nicholas, Bijelo Brdo
 Church of the Dormition of the Theotokos, Bijelo Brdo
 Church of St. George, Bobota
 Church of St. Peter and Paul, Bolman
 Church of St. Stephen, Borovo
 Church of St. Stefan Dečanski, Borovo Naselje
 Church of the Saint Archangel Gabriel, Bršadin
 Church of the Transfiguration of the Lord, Budimci
 Church of the Presentation of Mary, Čakovci
 Church of the Saint Archangel Michael, Čepin (destroyed in 1992)
 Church of St. Demetrius, Dalj (Eparchy's cathedral)
 Church of the Saint Archangel Michael, Darda
 Church of the Saint Archangel Gabriel, Erdut
 Church of the Nativity of the Theotokos, Gaboš
 Church of St. Nicholas, Jagodnjak
 Church of St. Stefan Štiljanović, Karanac
 Church of the Presentation of Mary, Kneževi Vinogradi
 Church of St. George, Kneževo
 Church of St. George, Marinci
 Church of Pentecost, Markušica
 Church of St. Nicholas, Mikluševci
 Church of St. Nicholas, Mirkovci
 Church of St. Panteleimon, Mirkovci
 Church of the Transfiguration of the Lord, Mohovo
 Church of the Dormition of the Theotokos, Negoslavci
 Church of St. Elijah, Novi Jankovci
 Church of St. George, Opatovac
 Church of St. Peter and Paul, Orolik
 Church of the Dormition of the Mother of God, Osijek
 Church of the Nativity of Saint John the Baptist, Ostrovo
 Church of St. Nicholas, Pačetin
 Church of the Nativity of the Theotokos, Petrova Slatina
 Church of the Transfiguration of the Lord, Petrovci
 Church of the Presentation of Mary, Popovac
 Church of St. Elijah, Silaš
 Church of St. Nicholas, Sotin
 Church of the Nativity of the Theotokos, Srijemske Laze
 Church of the Transfiguration of the Lord, Šarengrad
 Church of St. Nicholas, Tenja
 Church of the Transfiguration of the Lord, Trpinja
 Church of Pentecost, Vinkovci
 Church of St. Peter and Paul, Vladislavci
 Church of St Nicholas, Vukovar
 Church of the Holy Venerable Mother Parascheva, Vukovar
 Church of St. Elijah, Uglješ (in construction)
 Monastery of the Assumption of the Most Holy Mother of God in Dalj Planina

See also 
 Serbs of Croatia
 Eastern Orthodoxy in Croatia
 List of the Eparchies of the Serbian Orthodox Church

References

Sources

External links
 
 
 The Serbs in the Former SR of Croatia

Serbian Orthodox Church in Croatia
Serbian minority institutions and organizations in Croatia